Eric Francis may refer to:
 Eric Francis (born 1964), American journalist and astrologer, born Eric Francis Coppolino
 Eric Francis (actor) (1912–1991), credits include Theatre of Blood and Monty Python's The Meaning of Life
 Eric Francis (architect) (1887–1976), British architect
 Eric Francis (rugby union) (1894–1983), Australian rugby union player